Bully Drammeh (born 15 July 1995) is a Gambian international footballer who plays for Fortune FC, as a midfielder.

Career
Born in Brikama, he has played club football for Brikama United, Real de Banjul, LISCR and Fortune FC.

He made his international debut for Gambia in 2011.

References

1995 births
Living people
Gambian footballers
The Gambia international footballers
Brikama United FC players
Real de Banjul FC players
LISCR FC players
Association football midfielders
Gambian expatriate footballers
Gambian expatriates in Liberia
Expatriate footballers in Liberia